Shi Zhengrong (born on February 10, 1963) is a Chinese-Australian businessman and philanthropist. He is the founder and, up to March 2013, chairman and chief executive officer of Suntech Power.

Biography 
Shi was born in Yangzhong, Jiangsu, China. His identical twin brother is Chen Henglong, who is also a tycoon. He finished his undergraduate study at Changchun University of Science and Technology, and obtained his Master's degree from the Shanghai Institute of Optics and Fine Mechanics, Chinese Academy of Sciences. Afterward, Shi went to the University of New South Wales's School of Photovoltaic and Renewable Energy Engineering where he obtained his doctorate degree on solar power technology.

He acquired Australian citizenship and returned to China in 2001 to set up his solar power company - Suntech Power. According to Hurun Report's China Rich List 2013, he had a personal net worth of US$330 million.

Shi was elected Fellow of the Australian Academy of Technological Sciences and Engineering in 2009. In 2009, Shi also received the Oslo Business for Peace Award, an award chosen by Nobel winners to leaders in the private sector who have demonstrated transformative and positive change through ethical business practices.

Amid fierce price competition on its products, on 20 March 2013, the Suntech board declared bankruptcy in the wake of defaulting on US$541 million-worth of bonds, Shi had been demoted from chairman to director earlier that month. The Financial Times, quoting the Shanghai Securities News, reported at the time that Shi's movements were being restricted and that he was not allowed to leave China pending an investigation into his role at Suntech.  By 2016, he was living in Shanghai and frequently visiting Australia. As of 2017 and 2018, Dr. Shi Zhengrong had been seen actively giving key note speeches at solar conferences and promoting the use of solar technologies in both China and overseas.

Philanthropy
He has donated funds to a renewable energy research unit at the University of NSW, Australia "because he felt it was not getting an appropriate level of government support", according to Australian Greens Senator Christine Milne.

References

External links
 China: the Sun King, ABC Radio National
 Shi Zhengrong: China's sunshine boy, CNN
Shi Zhengrong, Time Magazine
#396 Shi Zhengrong, The World's Billionaires 2008, Forbes
Mr Sunshine: China's solar billionaire Shi Zhengrong

1963 births
Living people
21st-century Chinese businesspeople
Australian chief executives
Australian company founders
Australian energy industry businesspeople
Billionaires from Jiangsu
Businesspeople from Jiangsu
Changchun University of Science and Technology alumni
Chinese chief executives
Chinese company founders
Chinese emigrants to Australia
Chinese energy industry businesspeople
Fellows of the Australian Academy of Technological Sciences and Engineering
Identical twins
Naturalised citizens of Australia
People associated with solar power
People from Zhenjiang
Renewable energy commercialization
Sustainability advocates
Chinese twins
University of New South Wales alumni